Daan Hoole (born 22 February 1999) is a Dutch cyclist, who currently rides for UCI WorldTeam .

Major results

2016
 2nd Overall Keizer der Juniores
 3rd Overall Sint-Martinusprijs Kontich
1st Young rider classification
1st Stage 1 (TTT)
 10th Overall La Coupe du Président de la Ville de Grudziądz
2017
 2nd Paris–Roubaix Juniors
 2nd Menen–Kemmel–Menen
 3rd Time trial, National Junior Road Championships
 3rd Overall Trofeo Karlsberg
 3rd Nokere Koerse Juniores
 3rd La route des Géants
 4th Time trial, UEC European Junior Road Championships
 7th Time trial, UCI Junior Road World Championships
 8th Kuurne–Brussel–Kuurne Juniors
2018
 3rd Time trial, National Under-23 Road Championships
 3rd Omloop van het Waasland
2019
 1st  Time trial, National Under-23 Road Championships
 5th Lillehammer GP
 6th Time trial, UEC European Under-23 Road Championships
 8th Ronde van Overijssel
 9th Hafjell GP
 10th Time trial, UCI Road World Under-23 Championships
2020
 3rd Overall Orlen Nations Grand Prix
1st Stage 1 (TTT)
 8th Time trial, UEC European Under-23 Road Championships
2021
 1st Coppa della Pace
 2nd Overall Flanders Tomorrow Tour
 3rd  Time trial, UEC European Under-23 Road Championships
 5th Overall International Tour of Rhodes
 6th Time trial, UCI Road World Under-23 Championships
 8th Binche–Chimay–Binche
 9th Overall Tour de l'Avenir
1st Stage 2 (TTT)
2022
 National Road Championships
2nd Road race
3rd Time trial

Grand Tour general classification results timeline

References

External links

1999 births
Living people
Dutch male cyclists
People from Nissewaard
Cyclists from South Holland
21st-century Dutch people